Powrót is a Polish black comedy drama series commissioned by Canal+ featuring Bartłomiej Topa, Wojciech Mecwaldowski, and Magdalena Walach.

References

2022 Polish television series debuts
2020s Polish television series
Polish-language television shows
Television shows set in Warsaw
2020s black comedy television series